William Robert DeSteph Jr. (born October 28, 1964) is an American politician from Virginia. A member of the Republican Party, DeSteph is the member of the Virginia Senate, representing the 8th district.

DeSteph previously served in the Virginia House of Delegates, representing the 82nd district, after serving on the Virginia Beach City Council.

Electoral history

References

External links
 
 

Living people
Politicians from Virginia Beach, Virginia
Virginia city council members
Republican Party members of the Virginia House of Delegates
1964 births
21st-century American politicians
Politicians from Hartford, Connecticut
Republican Party Virginia state senators